Frank Keating or Francis Keating could refer to:

Frank Keating (born 1944), American attorney and former governor of Oklahoma
Frank A. Keating (1895–1973), United States Army general
Frank Keating (journalist) (1937–2013), English sportswriter
Frank Keating (1899–1978), American bank robber and member of the Holden–Keating Gang